WV is West Virginia, a U.S. state.

WV may also refer to:

Computing
 wv (software), software formerly known as MSWordView or wvware
 WavPack, software whose file extension is .wv
 Wireless Village, an instant messaging protocol and presence services

Other uses
 WV postcode area, England
 WV, a prefix for tombs found in the West Valley of the Valley of the Kings
 WandaVision, a 2021 Disney+ miniseries
 Lockheed EC-121 Warning Star, designated WV-1, WV-2, WV-3 in US Navy service
 Swe Fly (IATA airline designator WV)
 Weerodara Vibhushanaya, a military decoration in Sri Lanka
 Wikivoyage, a collaboratively edited, multilingual, free content Internet travel guide
 Werke-Verzeichnis, abbreviated to WV, German for 'works catalogue', used in relation to catalogues of classical compositions, such as BWV, BuxWV, and HWV.

cs:VW